Joseph A. Schwarcz (born 1947) is an author and a sessional instructor at McGill University. He is the director of McGill's Office for Science and Society.

Early life
Schwarcz is an only child, born in Sopron, Hungary to Jewish parents. During the Hungarian uprising in 1956, when he was age 9, the family escaped over the border to Austria and migrated to Canada and settled in Montreal, Quebec.  Schwarcz attended Logan school on Darlington and went on to study chemistry at McGill University in Montreal where he received a BSc (1969) and PhD (1973).

Schwarcz became interested in magic and chemistry at the age of 9 when he saw a magician perform a rope trick at a school friend's birthday party.  "Instead of using the usual magic words like Abracadabra, he said that he was going to sprinkle a ‘Magic Chemical’ on the ropes."  Schwarcz was so intrigued  that he went to the library and looked up chemistry;  he has had a keen interest in both since that day.

Biography

Schwarcz started his teaching career at Dawson College before moving to Vanier College serving as chair of the Department of Chemistry at both colleges.  He then returned to McGill University in 1980 where he teaches in courses in the Department of Chemistry and Faculty of Medicine  with an emphasis on alternative medicine.

In 1999 Schwarcz became the founding director of the McGill University Office for Science and Society (OSS) with Ariel Fenster and David N. Harpp. The OSS "...is a unique venture dedicated to the promotion of critical thinking and the presentation of scientific information to the public, educators and students in an accurate and responsible fashion."  As director, he takes on health fads and the celebrities who promote them. He has used his knowledge of magic to show how supernatural feats can be done by ordinary means.

Even as a university student, Schwarcz found chemistry to be a dry subject, so he established a series of courses designed to bring chemistry to the general student, and later to the public through a series of lectures.  The lectures include magic and spontaneity to keep the audience interested.

"A good lecturer is also an actor. A lecture should seem spontaneous, even if it's been given many times before...  You capture the audience's attention. Then, without their realizing it, you pump a little scientific information into their brains. Before they know it, they've learned something."

In 2010, 2012, and 2016/17 Schwarcz was nominated by McGill as one of the USA Science and Engineering Festival's Nifty Fifty Speakers.  .

Schwarcz began his media career in 1980 after meeting Montreal Gazette reporter Ted Blackman at the Man and His World exhibition when he was demonstrating how to make polyurethane from two liquids.  Blackman reported on the demonstration and made a significant error.  Schwarcz wrote to the Gazette , pointing out the error, and Blackman printed a retraction.  Radio station CJAD picked up the story and called Schwarcz to talk about it on air.  The following week another scientific issue arose and he was called on again; this led to regular collaborations and to his own weekly radio show (The Dr. Joe Show), which also ran on Toronto's CFRB for about two years.

Schwarcz has appeared hundreds of times on Canadian television and radio, including his single-season show about common foods called Science to Go on the Canadian Discovery Channel. He writes a weekly column for the Montreal Gazette called The Right Chemistry and a monthly column in the Canadian Chemical News.

He is one of the spokespersons for ScienceUpFirst, a science communication initiative aiming at reducing the impact of COVID misinformation online.

In 1999 Schwarcz was awarded the Grady-Stack Award for Interpreting Chemistry for the Public.  At the time, he was the first non-American to win the award. He was the joint winner of the 2014 Center for Skeptical Inquiry Robert P Balles Prize for skeptical thinking for his book Is This a Fact?

Schwarcz has honorary doctorates from Athabasca University (2002), Cape Breton University (2011), and Simon Fraser University (2019).

Personal life

Schwarcz and his wife Alice were married in 1973 and have three children. Alice died in March 2016.

Awards

 Royal Society of Canada, McNeil Medal for outstanding ability to promote and communicate science to students and to the public within Canada. (shared with David Harpp & Ariel Fenster) (1992)
 American Chemical Society, James T. Grady-James H. Stack Award for Interpreting Chemistry (1999)
 Honorary Doctorate of Science, Athabasca University (2002)
 Royal Canadian Institute, Sandford Fleming Medal (2005)
 Society of Chemical Industry, Purvis Memorial Award (2010)
 Chemical Institute of Canada, Montreal Medal (2010)
In 2014 the Committee for Skeptical Inquiry (CSICOP) presented Schwarcz the Robert B. Balles Prize in Critical Thinking for Is That a Fact? which "unflinchingly takes on all manner of popular misinformation."
Outstanding Achievement Award, Principal’s Prizes for Engagement Through Media, McGill University (2018)

Selected bibliography

References

External links 

 McGill's Office for Science and Society
 McGill University biography
 Your Health - Joe Schwarcz at TVOntario (25 programs, 2012 archive)
 public presentations in London, Ontario
 NIST Best Practices presentation by Dr. Joe

Canadian chemists
Canadian radio personalities
Canadian television personalities
Canadian science writers
Canadian skeptics
Canadian people of Hungarian-Jewish descent
Hungarian Jews
Hungarian emigrants to Canada
1947 births
Living people
Place of birth missing (living people)
Montreal Gazette people
Anglophone Quebec people
Academic staff of McGill University
McGill University Faculty of Science alumni
Writers from Montreal
Science communicators
Jewish Canadian journalists